"Undecided" is a popular song written by Sid Robin and Charlie Shavers and published in 1938.

Recordings
The first recording was made by John Kirby and The Onyx Club Boys on October 28, 1938, and released by Decca Records as catalog number 2216, with the B-side, "From A Flat to C".
It was also recorded by Chick Webb and his Orchestra with vocal by Ella Fitzgerald on February 17, 1939 and released by Decca Records as catalog number 2323, with the B-side, "In the Groove at the Grove".
The Dandridge Sisters recorded a cover in July, 1939, and Django Reinhardt recorded a version with Quintette du Hot Club de France, and Beryl Davis on vocals, in August of the same year.
The biggest hit version was recorded by The Ames Brothers with Les Brown's orchestra on June 25, 1951 and released by Coral Records as catalog number 60566, with the B-side, "Sentimental Journey". It first reached the Billboard chart on September 28, 1951 and lasted 20 weeks on the chart, peaking at number 6.
Also in 1951, a bebop treatment of the song was released by Gene Ammons. Billy May recorded the song as part of his 1955 album Arthur Murray Cha Cha Mambos.
In 1960, Harry James released a version on his album, Harry James...Today. (MGM E-3848)
Al Hirt released a version on his 1961 album, The Greatest Horn in the World.
Raffi recorded his version on his 1977 album, Adult Entertainment.
Natalie Cole recorded the song for her 1993 album, Take a Look.

Other media
This song is featured in the 2015 role-playing video game Fallout 4.

References

1938 songs
Ames Brothers songs
Al Hirt songs
Ella Fitzgerald songs
Natalie Cole songs